Jachnun or Jahnun is a Yemenite Jewish pastry, originating from the Adeni Jews, and traditionally served on Shabbat morning. Yemenite Jewish immigrants have popularized the dish in Israel.

Preparation
Jahnun is prepared from dough which is rolled out thinly and brushed with (traditionally) Samneh, which is clarified butter spiced with 'Hilbe' (fenugreek) and aged in a smoked vessel, traditionally using smoke from the wood of a specific tree, the  tree (presumably Dodonaea viscosa, sheth in Arabic), though regular clarified butter or shortening can be used. A little honey is sometimes added in addition, whereupon the dough is rolled up into rolls before cooking.

It is traditionally cooked overnight on a 'Shabbat hotplate' at a very low temperature, starting the cooking process on the Friday (usually in the morning), to be taken out and eaten on Shabbat (Saturday) morning, as it is forbidden by Jewish custom to start cooking or turn electrical implements on/off during the Shabbat. The Jahnun pieces are baked/steamed in a lidded pot (trapping moisture and preventing drying and burning).

This cooking process turns the dough a dark amber color, endowing it with a deep, sweet, caramelized taste. It is traditionally served with tomato salsa, a fresh grated tomato dip, hard boiled eggs, and zhug (a type of green herbal hot condiment). The dough used for Jachnun is the same as that used for malawach.

History
The idea of slow-cooking food in a way that conforms with Shabbat restrictions is ancient, originating with Cholent, or Hamin, a slow-cooked stew that originated in ancient Israel. Jachnun and its pan-fried cousin malawach probably originated as variations of Sephardic Jewish puff pastry, brought to Yemen by Jews expelled from Spain, according to Gil Marks.

See also
 Cholent
 Israeli cuisine
 Jewish cuisine

References

Further reading
 Hamitbah Hatemani (Yemenite Jewish Cooking), Sue Larkey, Modan (Hebrew)

External links
 Jachnun recipe

Jews and Judaism in Aden
Israeli pastries
Yemeni cuisine
Israeli cuisine
Shabbat food
Jewish cuisine
Jewish baked goods
Middle Eastern cuisine
Mizrahi Jewish cuisine